Jimmy Hill (June 6, 1918 - May 31, 1993) was an American Negro league baseball player who played for the Newark Eagles of the Negro National League from 1938 to 1945.

References

External links
 and Seamheads

1918 births
1993 deaths
Baseball players from Florida
Newark Eagles players
20th-century African-American sportspeople